Ian Albert Lindo (born 30 April 1983) is a Caymanian footballer who plays for George Town SC.

Career statistics

International goals
Scores and results list the Cayman Islands' goal tally first.

References

External links

1983 births
Living people
Association football defenders
Association football midfielders
Caymanian footballers
George Town SC players
Cayman Islands Premier League players
Cayman Islands international footballers